The 1988 NASCAR Busch Series began February 13 and ended October 30. Tommy Ellis of J&J Racing won the championship.

Schedule
Schedule as follows:

Races

Goody's 300 powered by Sprite 

The Goody's 300 powered by Sprite was held February 13 at Daytona International Speedway. Mike Swaim won the pole.

Top Ten Results

12-Bobby Allison
15-Geoff Bodine
17-Darrell Waltrip
06-Mark Martin
32-Dale Jarrett
28-Davey Allison
84-Mike Alexander
7-Harry Gant
25-Rob Moroso
22-Rick Mast

Mountain Dew 400 

The Mountain Dew 400 was held February 28 at Hickory Motor Speedway. Dale Jarrett won the pole.

Top Ten Results

84-Mike Alexander
6-Tommy Houston
11-Jack Ingram
99-Tommy Ellis
32-Dale Jarrett
21-Larry Pearson
5-Jimmy Hensley
8-Dale Earnhardt
00-Larry Pollard
25-Rob Moroso

Goodwrench 200 

The Goodwrench 200 was held March 5 at North Carolina Motor Speedway. Dale Earnhardt won the pole.

Top Ten Results

06-Mark Martin
84-Mike Alexander
32-Dale Jarrett
81-Bobby Hillin Jr.
7-Harry Gant
99-Tommy Ellis
22-Rick Mast
97-Morgan Shepherd
00-Larry Pollard
5-Jimmy Hensley

Miller Classic 

The Miller Classic was held March 13 at Martinsville Speedway. Larry Pearson won the pole.

Top Ten Results

5-Jimmy Hensley
2-L. D. Ottinger
25-Rob Moroso
84-Mike Alexander
11-Jack Ingram
41-Max Prestwood
22-Rick Mast
34-Jimmy Spencer
02-Kenny Burks
00-Larry Pollard

Country Squire 200 

The Country Squire 200 was held March 26 at Darlington Raceway. Geoff Bodine won the pole.

Top Ten Results

15-Geoff Bodine
7-Harry Gant
32-Dale Jarrett
8-Dale Earnhardt
81-Bobby Hillin Jr.
25-Rob Moroso
21-Larry Pearson
72-Rusty Wallace
06-Mark Martin
17-Darrell Waltrip

Budweiser 200 

The Budweiser 200 was held April 9 at Bristol Motor Speedway. Larry Pearson won the pole.

Top Ten Results

8-Dale Earnhardt
99-Tommy Ellis
11-Jack Ingram
25-Rob Moroso
34-Jimmy Spencer
90-Ed Berrier
6-Tommy Houston
7-Harry Gant
22-Rick Mast
75-Brad Teague

Hampton 200 

The Hampton 200 was held April 30 at Langley Speedway. Tommy Ellis won the pole.

Top Ten Results

99-Tommy Ellis
21-Larry Pearson
11-Jack Ingram
6-Tommy Houston
00-Larry Pollard
42-Elton Sawyer
07-Tommy Sigmon
34-Jimmy Spencer
84-Mike Alexander
14-Ronnie Silver

Pennsylvania 300 

The Pennsylvania 300 was held May 7 at Nazareth Speedway. Mike Alexander won the pole.

Top Ten Results

22-Rick Mast
25-Rob Moroso
12-Bobby Allison
11-Jack Ingram
5-Jimmy Hensley
8-Dale Earnhardt
00-Larry Pollard
34-Jimmy Spencer
39-Steve Grissom
99-Tommy Ellis

Busch 200 

The Busch 200 was held May 14 at South Boston Speedway. Tommy Ellis won the pole.

Top Ten Results

21-Larry Pearson
84-Mike Alexander
99-Tommy Ellis
14-Ronnie Silver
6-Tommy Houston
2-L. D. Ottinger
25-Rob Moroso
07-Tommy Sigmon
24-Joe Thurman
22-Rick Mast

CarQuest 200 

The CarQuest 200 was held May 21 at Nashville Speedway USA. Larry Pearson won the pole.

Top Ten Results

17-Darrell Waltrip
11-Jack Ingram
34-Jimmy Spencer
21-Larry Pearson
90-Ed Berrier
5-Jimmy Hensley
6-Tommy Houston
14-Ronnie Silver
84-Mike Alexander
2-L. D. Ottinger

Winn-Dixie 300 

The Winn-Dixie 300 was held May 28 at Charlotte Motor Speedway. Geoff Bodine won the pole.

Top Ten Results

32-Dale Jarrett
81-Bobby Hillin Jr.
12-Bobby Allison
25-Rob Moroso
8-Dale Earnhardt
7-Harry Gant
9-Bill Elliott
97-Morgan Shepherd
84-Mike Alexander
90-Ed Berrier

Budweiser 200 

The Budweiser 200 was held June 4 at Dover International Speedway. Mike Alexander won the pole.

Top Ten Results

81-Bobby Hillin Jr.
21-Larry Pearson
52-Ken Schrader
90-Ed Berrier
75-Brad Teague
99-Tommy Ellis
4-Kelly Moore
39-Steve Grissom
96-Tom Peck
84-Mike Alexander

Roses Stores 150 

The Roses Stores 150 was held June 11 at Orange County Speedway. Tommy Houston won the pole.

Top Ten Results

6-Tommy Houston
21-Larry Pearson
34-Jimmy Spencer
25-Rob Moroso
84-Mike Alexander
99-Tommy Ellis
5-Jimmy Hensley
84-Ronnie Silver
2-L. D. Ottinger
47-Billy Standridge

Big Star/Coca-Cola 200 

The Big Star/Coca-Cola 200 was held June 19 at Lanier Speedway. Larry Pearson won the pole.

Top Ten Results

6-Tommy Houston
5-Jimmy Hensley
21-Larry Pearson
2-L. D. Ottinger
84-Mike Alexander
02-Kenny Burks
47-Billy Standridge
34-Jimmy Spencer
00-Ronnie Silver
63-Mike Swaim

Granger Select 200 

The Granger Select 200 was held June 25 at Louisville Motor Speedway. Bobby Dotter won the pole.

Top Ten Results

99-Tommy Ellis
2-L. D. Ottinger
5-Jimmy Hensley
84-Mike Alexander
34-Jimmy Spencer
90-Ed Berrier
14-Ronnie Silver
39-Steve Grissom
07-Tommy Sigmon
63-Mike Swaim

Myrtle Beach 200 

The Myrtle Beach 200 was held July 2 at Myrtle Beach Speedway. L. D. Ottinger won the pole.

Top Ten Results

25-Rob Moroso
21-Larry Pearson
6-Tommy Houston
41-Max Prestwood
11-Jack Ingram
22-Rick Mast
42-Elton Sawyer
75-Brad Teague
81-Bobby Hillin Jr.
63-Mike Swaim

Oxford 250 

The Oxford 250 was held July 10 at Oxford Plains Speedway. Larry Pearson won the pole.

Top Ten Results

0-Dick McCabe
47-Kelly Moore
66-Randy LaJoie
71-Bobby Dragon
88-Larry Caron
26-Darren Bernier
99-Tommy Ellis
11-Jack Ingram
33-Joey Kourafas
7-Chuck Bown

Coors 200 

The Coors 200 was held July 16 at South Boston Speedway. Rob Moroso won the pole.

Top Ten Results

21-Larry Pearson
99-Tommy Ellis
6-Tommy Houston
11-Jack Ingram
22-Rick Mast
56-Ronald Cooper
90-Ed Berrier
42-Elton Sawyer
07-Tommy Sigmon
00-Ronnie Silver

Pepsi 200 

The Pepsi 200 was held July 23 at Hickory Motor Speedway. Rob Moroso won the pole.

Top Ten Results

6-Tommy Houston
5-Jimmy Hensley
99-Tommy Ellis
11-Jack Ingram
21-Larry Pearson
79-Bobby Dotter
00-Ronnie Silver
22-Rick Mast
25-Rob Moroso
07-Tommy Sigmon

Busch 200 

The Busch 200 was held July 30 at Langley Speedway. Tommy Ellis won the pole.

Top Ten Results

99-Tommy Ellis
11-Jack Ingram
5-Jimmy Hensley
6-Tommy Houston
22-Rick Mast
25-Rob Moroso
21-Larry Pearson
84-Mike Alexander
34-Jimmy Spencer
90-Ed Berrier

Kroger 200 

The Kroger 200 was held August 6 at Indianapolis Raceway Park. Kelly Moore won the pole.

Top Ten Results

97-Morgan Shepherd
6-Tommy Houston
99-Tommy Ellis
21-Larry Pearson
17-Darrell Waltrip
79-Bobby Dotter
06-Mark Martin
30-Kyle Petty
91-Tom Harrington
4-Kelly Moore

Poole Equipment 150 

The Poole Equipment 150 was held August 13 at Orange County Speedway. Larry Pearson won the pole.

Top Ten Results

22-Rick Mast
84-Mike Alexander
25-Rob Moroso
90-Ed Berrier
2-L. D. Ottinger
6-Tommy Houston
99-Tommy Ellis
56-Ronald Cooper
42-Elton Sawyer
02-Kenny Burks

Tri-City Pontiac 200 

The Tri-City Pontiac 200 was held August 26 at Bristol International Speedway. Tommy Ellis won the pole.

Top Ten Results

21-Larry Pearson
84-Mike Alexander
8-Dale Earnhardt
7-Harry Gant
5-Jimmy Hensley
34-Jimmy Spencer
28-Davey Allison
6-Tommy Houston
2-L. D. Ottinger
06-Mark Martin

Gatorade 200 

The Gatorade 200 was held September 3 at Darlington Raceway. Geoff Bodine won the pole.

Top Ten Results

7-Harry Gant
15-Geoff Bodine
17-Michael Waltrip
28-Davey Allison
97-Morgan Shepherd
34-Jimmy Spencer
84-Mike Alexander
25-Rob Moroso
66-Rusty Wallace
75-Brad Teague

Commonwealth 200 

The Commonwealth 200 was held September 10 at Richmond International Raceway. Harry Gant won the pole.

Top Ten Results

7-Harry Gant
21-Larry Pearson
25-Rob Moroso
99-Tommy Ellis
39-Steve Grissom
5-Jimmy Hensley
07-Tommy Sigmon
2-L. D. Ottinger
06-Mark Martin
90-Ed Berrier

''NOTE:  This was the first race held at the newly expanded Richmond International Raceway, expanded from .542 mile to the new .750 mile distance in February.

Grand National 200 

The Grand National 200 was held September 17 at Dover International Speedway. Harry Gant won the pole.

Top Ten Results

17-Michael Waltrip
99-Tommy Ellis
97-Morgan Shepherd
81-Bobby Hillin Jr.
56-Ronald Cooper
34-Jimmy Spencer
7-Harry Gant
2-L. D. Ottinger
11-Jack Ingram
28-Davey Allison

Advance Auto 150 

The Advance Auto 150 was held September 24 at Martinsville Speedway. Tommy Ellis won the pole.

Top Ten Results

7-Harry Gant
84-Mike Alexander
42-Elton Sawyer
21-Larry Pearson
34-Jimmy Spencer
22-Rick Mast
56-Ronald Cooper
0-Joe Millikan
6-Tommy Houston
25-Rob Moroso

All Pro 300 

The All Pro 300 was held October 8 at Charlotte Motor Speedway. Harry Gant won the pole.

Top Ten Results

25-Rob Moroso
15-Geoff Bodine
81-Bobby Hillin Jr.
52-Ken Schrader
17-Darrell Waltrip
99-Tommy Ellis
5-Jimmy Hensley
47-Billy Standridge
66-Rusty Wallace
32-Dale Jarrett

AC-Delco 200 

The AC-Delco 200 was held October 22 at North Carolina Motor Speedway. Harry Gant won the pole.

Top Ten Results

7-Harry Gant
8-Dale Earnhardt
28-Davey Allison
17-Darrell Waltrip
6-Tommy Houston
15-Geoff Bodine
81-Bobby Hillin Jr.
52-Ken Schrader
99-Tommy Ellis
79-Dave Rezendes

Winston Classic 

The Winston Classic was held October 30 at Martinsville Speedway. Tommy Houston won the pole.

Top Ten Results

7-Harry Gant
25-Rob Moroso
99-Tommy Ellis
2-L. D. Ottinger
22-Rick Mast
97-Morgan Shepherd
42-Elton Sawyer
75-Brad Teague
6-Tommy Houston
81-Bobby Hillin Jr.

Final points standings 

Tommy Ellis - 4281 
Rob Moroso - 3986
Larry Pearson - 3981
Mike Alexander -  3966
Tommy Houston - 3964
Jimmy Hensley - 3837
Jimmy Spencer - 3801
Rick Mast - 3773
L. D. Ottinger - 3670
Jack Ingram - 3485 
Ed Berrier - 3204
Billy Standridge - 3040
Steve Grissom - 2969
Mike Swaim - 2918
Ronald Cooper - 2843
Elton Sawyer - 2686
Tommy Sigmon - 2639
Joe Thurman - 2486
Harry Gant - 2238
Ronnie Silver - 2217
Kenny Burks - 1968
Bobby Hillin Jr. - 1945
Brad Teague - 1781
Morgan Shepherd - 1646
Dale Earnhardt - 1633
Dale Jarrett - 1607
Bobby Dotter - 1600 
Larry Pollard - 1489
Darrell Waltrip - 1262
Mark Martin - 1211
Geoff Bodine - 1171
Davey Allison - 1111
Ken Schrader - 1050
Patty Moise - 1001
Max Prestwood - 846
Dale Shaw - 756 
Bobby Allison - 656
Tom Peck - 596
Jamie Aube - 587
Jeff Burton - 569
Bosco Lowe - 553
Kelly Moore - 548 
Kyle Petty - 537
Tom Harrington - 477 
Joe Millikan - 455
Sterling Marlin - 445
Mike Porter - 430
Joe Bessey - 428
Donny Ling Jr. - 424
Brett Hearn - 410

See also 
 1988 NASCAR Winston Cup Series

References

External links 
Busch Series Standings and Statistics for 1988

NASCAR Xfinity Series seasons